Rago is an unincorporated community in Kingman County, Kansas, United States.

Education
The community is served by Kingman–Norwich USD 331 public school district.

Notable people
Rago was the hometown of Clyde Vernon Cessna, original founder of Cessna Aircraft.

References

Further reading

External links
 Kingman County maps: Current, Historic, KDOT

Unincorporated communities in Kingman County, Kansas
Unincorporated communities in Kansas